Aubiet is a commune in the Gers department in southwestern France.

Geography

Localisation

Roads and transports 

National road 124, which goes from Toulouse to Auch, passes by Aubiet.

Aubiet has a train station.

Population

See also
Communes of the Gers department

References

Communes of Gers